Finlayola lurida is a species of sea snail, a marine gastropod mollusk in the family Pyramidellidae, the pyrams and their allies.

Distribution
This marine species is endemic to New Zealand.

References

 Suter, H. (1908). Result of dredging for Mollusca near Cuvier Island, with descriptions of new species. Transactions of the New Zealand Institute. 40: 344–359.

External links
 To World Register of Marine Species

Pyramidellidae
Gastropods described in 1908